DYFM (101.9 FM), broadcasting as 101.9 Radyo5 News FM, is a radio station owned by the Nation Broadcasting Corporation and operated by TV5 Network Inc. The station's studio is located at TV5 Complex, Capitol Road, Camp Marina, Brgy. Kalunasan, Cebu City, while its transmitter is located at Busay Hills, Cebu City. This station operates daily from 4:00 AM to 12:00 MN. It is considered to be the first stereo FM station in Cebu City.

History

1975-1998: MRS
DYNC was Cebu's first FM station established on February 1, 1975, as MRS 101.9 Most Requested Song. It carried an adult contemporary format. It was located along Juana Osmeña, Ext. and later moved to Krizia Bldg. along Gorordo Ave.

1998-2008: Charlie

On September 1, 1998, after NBC was acquired by PLDT Beneficial Trust Fund's broadcasting division MediaQuest Holdings, Inc from the consortium of the Yabut family and then House Speaker Manny Villar, the station was reformatted as Charlie @ Rhythms 101.9, with a Top 40 format. On August 1, 2005, the "Rhythms" tag was dropped and adopted the slogan "Get your Groove On". At the same time, it reformatted into a Smooth AC station. However, in 2008, lack of advertisers' and financial problems led to 101.9 Charlie's closure of operations in Cebu after 33 years of broadcasting.

2009-2011: WAV FM
On September 27, 2009, DYNC returned on the air, this time as DYFM. Audiowav Media (WAV Atmospheric) took over the station's operations, along with NBC's stations in Visayas and Mindanao, and relaunched it as WAV FM. It carried a Top 40 format with the slogan "Philippines' Hit Music Station". At that time, its studios moved from Krizia Bldg. along Gorordo Ave. to Ybañez Bldg. in Fuente Osmeña. The Radio Station was programmed by Caloy Hinolan.

2011-present: Radyo5

On December 1, 2011, TV5 took over the station's operations and relaunched it as Radyo5 101.9 News FM, the first and only originating news/talk radio station on the FM band that delivers news and information. The station transferred to its current home at TV5 Complex in Kalunasan.

It began simulcasting Manila's 92.3 News FM since then. On November 12, 2012, the station launched its local programming. It began its main broadcast at 5:30am with the first local radio program entitled Frankahai Ta! anchored by Atty. Frank Malilong Jr. until his resignation on May 2014 due to health reasons.

References

Radyo5 News FM stations
Radio stations in Metro Cebu
News and talk radio stations in the Philippines
Radio stations established in 1975